Hwang Jun-seok  is a South Korean engineer. He currently serves as a Director and Dean of the Technology Management, Economics and Policy Program (TEMEP) and of the International Information Technology Policy Scholarship Program (ITPP) at the Seoul National University and Associate Professor at the Seoul National University.

Education
Hwang received his B.S. degree from Yonsei University, Seoul specializing in Mathematics, his M.S. degree in Telecommunications from the University of Colorado, and his Ph.D. in Information Science and Telecommunications from the University of Pittsburgh, Pennsylvania in the United States with the Dissertation entitled "A Market-Based Model for the Bandwidth Management of IntServ-DiffServ QoS Interconnection".

Career
He is now leading the research groups of IT Innovation Study, Telecommunications Industry & Broadband Convergence in TEMEP in SNU. Simultaneously, he has been supervising research and theses of Master's and Doctoral candidates in SNU. He is actively taking part in the local and international research and academic organizations. Prof. Hwang is also teaching and supervising the International students from as much as 40 countries in International Information Technology Policy Scholarship Program (ITPP) in Seoul National University, South Korea.

In September, 2008, Prof. Hwang co-chaired and organized the Seoul Global Conference on ICT and Convergence held in Seoul.

Awards
 Winner of the Best Paper Award with the paper entitled in the Economics of Interconnection among Hybrid QoS Networks in the Next Generation Internet, The International Telecommunications Society (ITS) 2000, Buenos Aires, Argentina, July 2000.
 Winner of the 1999 Beta Phi-Mu Pi Chapter Scholarly Research Paper for a paper entitled QoS-Support for Internet Telephony: Beyond the Best-Effort Nature of the Internet, March 1999.
 Outstanding Thesis of the Year Award The Prospects for Mobile Satellite Communications and Broadband Satellite Communications: Technical and Regulatory Issues and Trend Analysis, ITP (Interdisciplinary Telecommunications Program)-University of Colorado, Boulder, CO. 1996.
 Graduate Student Assistantship and Full Tuition Scholarship, The School of Information Sciences, University of Pittsburgh, 1996 - 1999.
 Excellence in Research and Development, Award in Computing, Hyosung Computer R&D Center, Seoul.

References 
 https://web.archive.org/web/20050921131929/http://web.syr.edu/~jshwang/pages/personal.html
 http://itpp.snu.ac.kr
 http://temep.snu.ac.kr
 http://itpp.snu.ac.kr
 http://www.informatik.uni-trier.de/~ley/db/indices/a-tree/h/Hwang:Junseok.html
 http://portal.acm.org/author_page.cfm?id=81100581705&coll=GUIDE&dl=GUIDE&trk=0
 http://www.faqs.org/patents/inv/154462
 https://web.archive.org/web/20050522152845/http://ccgrid2003.apgrid.org/online_posters/posters/026.pdf
 http://www.ejov.org/forms/document.asp?Q=1591&T=DocAuthors
 https://web.archive.org/web/20080108024845/http://web.syr.edu/~jshwang/pages/publication.html
 https://ssrn.com/abstract=1105614

Year of birth missing (living people)
Living people
Seoul National University alumni
Academic staff of Seoul National University
South Korean engineers
University of Colorado alumni
University of Pittsburgh alumni